This is a list of diplomatic missions in Zambia. The capital Lusaka currently hosts 41 embassies/high commissions.

Embassies/High commissions in Lusaka

Other posts in Lusaka 
 (Delegation)

Consulates General

Lusaka

Mongu

Ndola

Solwezi

Non-resident embassies and high commissions

Closed missions

See also 
 Foreign relations of Zambia
 List of diplomatic missions of Zambia

References

External links
 Embassies/Consulates in Zambia

Diplomatic missions
Zambia
Diplomatic missions